Devičany is an old village and municipality in the Levice District in the Nitra Region of Slovakia.

History
In historical records the village was first mentioned in 1075.

Geography
The village lies at an altitude of 260 metres and covers an area of 29.875 km². It has a population of about 388 people.

Facilities
The village has a public library and a  football pitch.

Genealogical resources

The records for genealogical research are available at the state archive "Statny Archiv in Nitra, Slovakia"

 Roman Catholic church records (births/marriages/deaths): 1688-1898 (parish B)
 Lutheran church records (births/marriages/deaths): 1655-1895 (parish A)

See also
 List of municipalities and towns in Slovakia

External links
https://web.archive.org/web/20071116010355/http://www.statistics.sk/mosmis/eng/run.html
Surnames of living people in Devicany

Villages and municipalities in Levice District